The English Reader: or, Pieces in Prose and Poetry, Selected from the Best Writers Designed to Assist Young Persons to Read with Propriety and Effect; to Improve Their Language and Sentiments; and to Inculcate Some of the Most Important Principles of Piety and Virtue. : With a Few Preliminary Observations on the Principles of Good Reading. by Lindley Murray is an eighteenth century textbook written in 1799 and published in the United States. The volume is one of the most widely held in American libraries. The book is available in the public domain.

References

External links
 1839 edition at Google Books

Literary textbooks
American poetry anthologies
1799 books